This is a list of notable people, living or dead, accompanied by verifiable source citations associating them with ankylosing spondylitis, either based on their own public statements, or (in the case of dead people only) reported contemporary or posthumous diagnoses. Ankylosing spondylitis (AS) is a type of arthritis in which there is long-term inflammation of the joints of the spine. Typically the joints where the spine joins the pelvis are also affected. Occasionally other joints such as the shoulders or hips are involved.

John Addey (1920–1982), English astrologer
 Simon Armitage (born 1963), English poet, playwright and novelist
 Mike Atherton (born 1968), broadcaster, journalist and retired England international cricketer
 Reverend William Barber II (born 1963), civil rights activist
 Beau Biden (1969-2015), American politician, lawyer and oldest child of U.S. president Joe Biden
 Rico Brogna (born 1970), former Major League Baseball first baseman
 Karel Čapek (1890–1938), Czech writer
 Jay Chou (born 1979), Taiwanese musician, singer-songwriter, music and film producer, actor and director
 Norman Cousins (1915–1990), American political journalist, author, professor and peace activist
 Bruce Furniss (born 1957), American former swimmer
Andrew George (born 1958), British Liberal Democrat politician
 Bryan Gunn (born 1963), Scottish former professional goalkeeper and football manager
 Franklin Gutiérrez (born 1983), Venezuelan-born Major League Baseball player
 Tanya Harrison, American-Canadian planetary scientist and science communicator
 Edward Hubbard (1937–1989), an English architectural historian who worked with Nikolaus Pevsner in compiling volumes of the Buildings of England
 Lee Hurst (born 1962), English comedian 
 Michael King (born 1950), English professional golfer 
Zachary "Zach" Kornfeld (born 1990), best known as one of the Try Guys
 Vladimir Kramnik (born 1975), Russian chess grandmaster and former World Chess Champion
 Paul Kuhr (born 1971), American musician, vocalist, lyricist, author, graphic designer and a founding member of the band Novembers Doom
 Giacomo Leopardi (1798–1837), Italian poet, philosopher and writer; controversial case
 Iain Macleod (1913–1970), British Conservative Party politician and government minister
 Mick Mars (born 1951), lead guitarist for American heavy metal band Mötley Crüe
 Nikolai Ostrovsky (1904–1936), Soviet socialist realist writer, who published his works during the Stalin era
 Joe Perry, snooker player
 Christa Reinig (1926–2008), German writer
 Dan Reynolds (born 1987), lead singer of Grammy award-winning rock group Imagine Dragons, who first revealed that he had the condition at an event in Leeds, UK, in November 2015
 Michael Slater (born 1971), former Australian cricketer
 Chris Small (born 1973), retired Scottish professional snooker player
 Kodi Smit-McPhee (13 June 1996), Australian actor
 William Soutar (1898–1943), Scottish poet
 Jens Stoltenberg (born 1959), Prime Minister of Norway (2000–2001 and 2005–2013) and 13th Secretary General of NATO
 Ed Sullivan (1901–1974), American television personality, sports and entertainment reporter and syndicated columnist
 David Oswald Thomas (1924–2005), Welsh philosopher
 Leonard Trask (1805–1861), whose condition provided the first American description of anklyosing spondylitis
 Dylan Verrechia (born 1976) filmmaker
 Michael Woodhouse (born ),  Minister of Immigration, Police, and Workplace Relations and Safety for New Zealand, and Honorary Life Member of Arthritis New Zealand
 Ian Woosnam (born 1958), Welsh professional golfer
 Jessica Curry (born )  English videogame music composer
 Joost Zwagerman (1963–2015), Dutch writer
 Michelle Butler Hallett (1971-),  Canadian writer

References

Ankylosing spondylitis
Lists of people by medical condition